Testimony: Vol. 2, Love & Politics is the fourth studio album by American singer India.Arie, released February 10, 2009 on Universal Republic Records. The album debuted as "Hot Shot" on the Billboard 200 in the week of February 28, 2009 at #3, selling in its first week around 76,000 copies, almost half less than her previous album in 2006. The next week it fell to number 7, selling another 32,000 copies.

Background
Speaking about the album to writer Pete Lewis of Blues & Soul in April 2009, India stated;

Commercial performance
The album debuted as "Hot Shot" on the Billboard 200 in the week of February 28, 2009 at number three, selling in its first week around 76,000 copies, almost half less than her previous album in 2006. The next week it fell to number 7, selling another 32,000 copies. The album has sold 331,000 copies on U.S to date.

The single "Chocolate High" went for adds at U.S. urban adult contemporary radio the week of November 28, 2008. That single as well as its follow-up, "Therapy", were both released to iTunes in the U.S. on December 16, 2008.

Track listing

Charts

Weekly charts

Year-end charts

References

External links
 

2009 albums
India Arie albums
Sequel albums